Ruggero Tita (born 20 March 1992) is an Italian sailor. He competed at the 2020 Summer Olympics, with Caterina Banti, in Nacra 17, winning a gold medal.

From the age of 12 on the national team, he conquered the title of Italian champion in the Optimist class at 13 years old, later he became European Team race champion and Swiss Open champion.
He competed in the 29er class and after a short period he moved on to the 49er class where he became an Italian champion.

In 2015, he won the Olympic Week on Lake Garda and subsequently the U23 Youth European Champion and the silver medal at the U23 Youth World Championship.
Subsequently, with Pietro Zucchetti, represented Italy at the 2016 Summer Olympics in the 49er event.

Currently, he is combating in the Nacra 17 class where he won, with the Caterina Banti, a Bronze and a Gold in the World Championships, 2 consecutive European titles, 2 golds, 1 silver and 1 bronze in the World Cup Series. They won the Olympic Test Event and currently they occupy the first place in the World Ranking.

Italian sailor of the year twice in a row and nominated for the Rolex Sailor of the Year award.

Work with the LUNA ROSSA PRADA PIRELLI team in the 36th America’s Cup.

He has a degree in Computer Engineering from the University of Trento and is passionate about extreme sports such as kitesurfing, surfing, snowkiting, freeride, speedfly, paraglide, snowboarding and freestyle skiing.

Biography

Career 
He approached sailing at the age of 8–9 years, at the Trentino sailing association. Immediately demonstrate a great passion and a great talent for sailing.

Optimist 
From 2005 he began to collect successes on the optimist and in 2007 he participated in the World Championship in Cagliari. Despite a brilliant start, he finished the world championship in 21st place.

29er 
In October of the same year he compete for the first time in 29er with Takuya Gamboni.
In 2008 he participated in the 29er national regattas obtaining excellent results, he also collected some good international results a 4th and a 6th place in the 2 stages of EuroCup in Cavalaire and Kiel.
It ranks among the best 10 at the European in Medemblik (1st Italian) and among the top 10 in the world at the ISAF World Cup.

49er 
After just one year of 29er he moved to the 49er with his partner Nicolas Piccinelli and they competed in the Italian Olympic Class Championship managing to get on the Bronze medal.
Regatta with Nicolò Fasoli since March 2009.
2009 season opens with a new crew, Matteo Gritti with whom he celebrates his 18th birthday by winning the national regatta that was held in those days and together they won the Italian title in 2010.
In 2011 he competed in the 49er Youth World Championship with Lorenzo Franceschini and ended the season by winning the Italian Olympic Class Championship with Lorenzo Bianchini.
In November 2011 got the extraordinary opportunity to helm with Gianfranco Sibello. After a month of intense training in Loano they competed in the 49er World Championship, to qualify the Italy for 49er event at the 2012 Summer Olympics.

Despite they did not get the qualification, Ruggero did not give up and went back to the water with Sebastian Nulli at the World Cup Series in Palma de Majorca.
During this event he met Gianluca Semeraro with whom he competed in the 2012 European Championships finishing 15th.
After a short time in the kite world in March (2013) he returned to the 49er with Giacomo Cavalli, together they travel the world attending several international events including:
Sail Sydney in 2013 (2nd), the Intergalatic Regatta (12th) and the South American Championship (11th) in Rio de Janeiro 2014, the Arenal Trophy in Palma del Majorca Spain (7th) and several stages of the Sailing World Cup.

In 2016 with Pietro Zucchetti represented Italy in 49er event at the 2016 Summer Olympicsfinishing in 14th place.

Nacra17 
After the Rio de Janeiro Olympics, he tried the Nacra 17 with Caterina Banti as crew. Together they got the 3rd place in the Italian Olympic Class Championship and following this result they started the Olympic campaign for Tokyo 2020 in Nacra.
They immediately got excellent results, Bronze at the World Cup and Gold at the 2017 European Championship. In 2018 they confirmed the European title and won the World title.

References

External links
 
 
 
 

1992 births
Living people
Italian male sailors (sport)
Olympic sailors of Italy
Olympic medalists in sailing
Olympic gold medalists for Italy
Sailors at the 2016 Summer Olympics – 49er
Sailors at the 2020 Summer Olympics – Nacra 17
Medalists at the 2020 Summer Olympics